Marie Zelenková is a female former Czechoslovakian international table tennis player.

She won a bronze medal during the 1948 World Table Tennis Championships in the Corbillon Cup for Czechoslovakia. The team consisted of Eliska Fürstova, Marie Kettnerová and Vlasta Pokorna.

See also
 List of World Table Tennis Championships medalists

References

Czech female table tennis players
World Table Tennis Championships medalists
Living people
Year of birth missing (living people)